Ada Township may refer to:
 Ada Township, Michigan
 Ada Township, Dickey County, North Dakota
 Ada Township, Perkins County, South Dakota

Township name disambiguation pages